Joe El-Abd  (born 23 February 1980) is a rugby union player. He currently coaches for Castres Olympique in France (Jan 2018).

El-Abd began playing rugby at Hove RFC and at the University of Bath, and after an unsuccessful spell with Bath Rugby, he joined Caerphilly RFC and later Bristol Rugby in 2003, where he has spent the best part of his career and become a regular fixture at open-side flanker.

As of 2008 he has made over 100 appearances for Bristol and captained the side on several occasions, being named the club's regular captain at the start of the 2008/09 season.

He moved to Toulon in the French Top 14 in 2009 playing there until 2012, when he moved to Oyonnax.

El-Abd has an English mother and an Egyptian father and is one of three brothers. His younger brother, Adam El-Abd, is a professional footballer who plays for Whitehawk FC and Egypt.

References

External links
Bristol Rugby Player Profile
Toulon RC profile

1980 births
Living people
Alumni of the University of Bath
Bath Rugby players
Bristol Bears players
English expatriate rugby union players
English expatriate sportspeople in France
English people of Egyptian descent
English rugby union players
Expatriate rugby union players in France
RC Toulonnais players
Rugby union players from Brighton
Team Bath rugby union players
Rugby union flankers